Mount Battle is a mountain located  northeast of Pangnirtung on Baffin Island, Nunavut, Canada. It is part of the Baffin Mountains which in turn form part of the Arctic Cordillera mountain system.

Mount Battle is named for Ben Battle, a geomorphologist from McGill University, who drowned crossing a melt water-swollen stream near Glacier Lake during the 1953 Arctic Institute of North America research-mountaineering expedition.

References

External links
 TopoZone - Mount Battle

Arctic Cordillera
One-thousanders of Nunavut